Natalia Uzhviy (Ukrainian: Наталія Михайлівна Ужвій;   22 or 29 July 1986) was a Ukrainian actress.

Biography 

Natalia Uzhviy was born on 8 September 1898 in Liuboml and was the oldest of 7 children.

Works

Theater

Filmography

Awards 

 Order of the Red Banner of Labour (1939, 1948, 1951, ?)
 Order of the Badge of Honour (1940)
 People's Artist of the USSR (1944)
 Order of Lenin (1944, 1960, 1968, 1973)
 State Stalin Prize (1946, 1949, 1951)
 Hero of Socialist Labour (1973)
 Order of Friendship of Peoples (1978)
 Shevchenko State Prize of Ukrainian SSR (1984)

References

External links 

 

Heroes of Socialist Labour
People's Artists of the USSR
Stalin Prize winners
Recipients of the Order of Lenin
Recipients of the Order of the Red Banner of Labour
Recipients of the Shevchenko National Prize
Communist Party of the Soviet Union members
1898 births
1986 deaths
Ukrainian actresses
Soviet actresses